Ikari Warriors, known as  in Japan, is a vertically scrolling run and gun video game released for arcades by SNK in 1986. It was published in North America by Tradewest. At the time there were many Commando clones on the market. What distinguished Ikari Warriors were rotary joysticks and a two-player cooperative mode. The rotary joystick controls were in turn based on SNK's earlier TNK III (1985). Ikari was originally intended it to be an official licensed adaptation of the film Rambo: First Blood Part II (1985), but SNK were initially unable to acquire the rights to the film.

The game was a major commercial success in arcades. It was Japan's second highest-grossing table in 1986, and London's third highest-grossing arcade game that year. It was also a major breakthrough US release for SNK, ranking among America's top five highest-grossing dedicated arcade games for two years in a row, in 1986 and 1987.

Gameplay
The player takes the role of commandos named Colonel Ralf Jones (red) and Second Lieutenant Clark Still (blue), who must try to reach the village of Ikari. Enemy units attempting to kill the player include tanks, enemy soldiers and helicopters. A number of power-ups along the way help the player achieve victory.

Players must proceed from the bottom of the screen upwards, towards the village of Ikari. Trying to prevent them from reaching the village are enemy soldiers and other units. Along the way, players may commandeer enemy tanks and helicopters (NES version) to help fight their way through the enemy personnel. The tanks are immune to enemy bullets, but have a limited supply of fuel and will sustain damage when it runs out or the tank is caught in an explosion, taking the player with it unless he can exit the tank and get clear before it blows up. The helicopters have two different weapons, a spread gun and a cannon, and may fly over water.

Rotating the joystick changes the direction the character faced independent of the direction the character was moving, as controlled by pushing the joystick. This gives the player freedom to attack or walk in eight different directions. No shot is fired from directly in front of the player; the warrior uses the machine gun in his right hand, and throws grenades with his left. If a player character takes too long moving up screen, the computer starts using "call for fire". A red spot appears below him; this is tracking fire to speed up the game.

Hardware
Ikari Warriors uses SNK's model LS-30 joysticks, which contain a 12-way rotary switch box. The joysticks can be rotated in addition to being pushed in eight directions. The less successful TNK III, released in 1985 and also from SNK, is the first to have used such joysticks. There are also two buttons: one for the standard gun and another for lobbing grenades.

Ikari Warriors printed circuit boards (PCBs) were manufactured in two different versions:  SNK pinout and JAMMA pinout.  Most SNK-pinout units were put into Ikari Warriors cabinets, while most JAMMA-pinout units were supplied as conversion kits. The SNK-pinout boards have a 22/44-pin edge connectors. The JAMMA-pinout PCBs have a 28/56-pin edge connectors. Both types consist of a stack of three boards, with interconnects.

Development
The game was developed by SNK, where it was designed and directed by Koji Obada. He had previously designed SNK's TNK III (1985), known as T.A.N.K. in Japan and Europe, a vertical tank shooter inspired by Taito's Front Line (1982) that used rotary joystick controls. The same year, Capcom's vertical run-and-gun shooter Commando (1985), known as Senjō no Ōkami ("Wolf of the Battlefield") in Japan, had become a major global arcade hit. Ikari combined the run-and-gun shooter gameplay of Commando with the rotary joysticks and tank vehicles of T.A.N.K.

The game was also inspired by the action film Rambo: First Blood Part II (1985), released as Rambo: Ikari no Dasshutsu ("Rambo: The Furious Escape") in Japan. Obada had originally intended the game to be an official licensed adaptation of Rambo, but SNK were initially unable to acquire the rights to the film. This resulted in the game's title being shortened to Ikari, referencing part of the film's Japanese title. After the game made its North American debut at an arcade game expo, they got in touch with the film's star Sylvester Stallone, who was friends with SNK's president, about acquiring the rights to the film. However, it was too late by that point, as the game had already become popularly known by its Japanese title Ikari among arcade players in Japan and North America, leading to the game being officially released as Ikari Warriors in North America.

Regional differences
In addition to changing the names of the main characters from Ralf and Clark to Paul and Vince, the military commander the player rescues at the end of the game is named General Kawasaki in the Japanese version (named after SNK's founder Eikichi Kawasaki) and Colonel Cook in the US/Euro version (named after Tradewest's founder Leland Cook). General Kawasaki's name was unchanged in the NES version. The enemies in the game were actually Neo-Nazis, as evidenced by the presence of a swastika at the middle of the final room.

Ports

Ikari Warriors was initially ported to the Apple II, Commodore 64 and IBM PC by Quicksilver Software and published by Data East USA in the US in 1986. Elite Systems acquired the licence for Europe releasing the Amstrad CPC version in late 1986. A version for the ZX Spectrum by David Perry was scheduled for November 1986 but was never released.

In 1988 Elite published a second Commodore 64 port (by John Twiddy, programmer of The Last Ninja), a new ZX Spectrum port (by David Shea, author of the Amstrad version) along with versions for the Commodore 16, Amiga and Atari ST.

SNK released their own port for the MSX in 1987. The NES version was developed by Micronics. Both the Atari 2600 and Atari 7800 ports were released in 1990 as one of the final published games for those systems. The game was also included on the SNK 40th Anniversary Collection for various modern consoles and Windows (through Steam).

Reception

In Japan, Game Machine listed Ikari on their March 15, 1986 issue as being the most-successful table arcade cabinet of the month. It remained at the top of the Game Machine table arcade cabinet charts through April and early May, before returning to the top in June 1986. It went on to become Japan's second highest-grossing table arcade game of 1986. In the United Kingdom, it was one of the top three highest-grossing arcade games of 1986 in London, appearing at number-three on the annual 1986 Electrocoin chart.

In North America, Ikari Warriors was the second top-grossing arcade game on the monthly Play Meter charts in July 1986. It went on to be one of the top five highest-grossing dedicated arcade games of 1986 according to AMOA, and the year's eight highest arcade video game according to RePlay. It was also among the top five dedicated arcade games of 1987.

In 1996, Next Generation listed the arcade version of Ikari Warriors as number 61 on their "Top 100 Games of All Time", lauding the innovative joysticks, play balance, and power-ups which offer an invigorating boost to the player character's capabilities without taking away the game's challenge.

Conversions
Computer and Video Games enthusiastically reviewed the "classy" Amstrad personal computer conversion, calling the graphics "simply brilliant" and the gameplay "awesomely addictive". They said that players "won't see better ... probably for quite a while" because "the Amstrad graphics are as close as dammit to the arcade machine and the playability goes off the C+VG scale".

The IBM PC version of the game received 4 out of 5 stars in Dragon.

Legacy
Ikari Warriors spawned the sequels Victory Road (1986) and Ikari III: The Rescue (1989).

SNK released an Ikari Warriors clone in 1987 called Guerrilla War (known as Guevara in Japan). The game features communist fighters Che Guevara and Fidel Castro as its heroes.

Sylvester Stallone, whose role as John Rambo had an influence on the game, owned an Ikari Warriors arcade cabinet in the 1980s. The future mixed martial arts (MMA) champion Kazushi Sakuraba (later famous for defeating the Gracie family of Brazilian jiu-jitsu fighters) was also a fan of Ikari in his high school years.

The characters Ralf and Clark appeared again as playable characters in Metal Slug 6 and Metal Slug 7, as well as in the King of Fighters series. Their names were used for two minor unrelated characters in Crystalis, and they were featured as cameos in Super Smash Bros. Ultimate as background characters in the King Of Fighters Stadium stage.

See also

 Front Line, a 1982 arcade game with similar gameplay, including a rotary knob and drivable tanks.
 Time Soldiers, a 1987 arcade shooter with similar gameplay, released by SNK.

References

External links

1986 video games
Amiga games
Amstrad CPC games
Apple II games
Arcade video games
Atari 2600 games
Atari 7800 games
Atari ST games
Commodore 16 and Plus/4 games
Commodore 64 games
Cooperative video games
Fictional duos
Mobile games
MSX2 games
Multiplayer and single-player video games
Nintendo Entertainment System games
Nintendo Switch games
PlayStation Network games
PlayStation 4 games
Run and gun games
SNK franchises
SNK games
SNK Playmore games
Tradewest games
ZX Spectrum games
Video games developed in Japan
Hamster Corporation games
Quicksilver Software games